Lawton Public Schools is a public school district based in Lawton, Oklahoma, United States.

The district serves most of the city of Lawton, a small portion of Medicine Park, and surrounding rural areas in central Comanche County. Secondary students living in the dependent districts of Bishop and Flower Mound also attend Lawton Public Schools.

Schools
Lawton Public Schools operates three high schools, four middle schools, nineteen elementary schools, and two pre-kindergarten centers.

High schools
Grades 9-12
Eisenhower High School
Lawton High School
MacArthur High School
Life Ready Center

Middle schools
Grades 6-8
Central Middle School
Eisenhower Middle School
MacArthur Middle School

Elementary schools
Grades K-5
Almor West Elementary School
Carriage Hills Elementary School
Cleveland Elementary 
Crosby Park Elementary School
Edison Elementary School 
Eisenhower Elementary School
Freedom Elementary School
Hugh Bish Elementary School
John Adams Elementary School
Lincoln Elementary School
Pat Henry Elementary School
Ridgecrest Elementary School
Washington Elementary School
Whittier Elementary School
Woodland Hills Elementary School
Grades PK-5
Carriage Hills Elementary School
Pioneer Park Elementary School
Sullivan Village Elementary School

Pre-Kindergarten Centers
Beginnings Academy
Learning Tree Academy

See also

List of school districts in Oklahoma

External links
Lawton Public Schools – Official site.
Oklahoma State Department of Education

School districts in Oklahoma
Lawton, Oklahoma
Education in Comanche County, Oklahoma
School districts established in 1901